Greenwich Village Theatre was an arts venue in Greenwich Village, New York which opened in 1917 and closed for the last time in 1930. Herman Lee Meader was the architect and it was located in Sheridan Square at 4th Street and Seventh Avenue. It was an intimate theatre that seated 450, and is no longer extant. It  was originally built for Frank Conroy's Greenwich Village Players.

The theatre provided the venue for the first series of performances organised by the International Composers' Guild between 19 February and 23 April 1922. The ICG moved on to the Klaw Theatre for their second season.

References

Off-Broadway theaters
Greenwich Village
Theatre in the United States